Bad Mood is the second album by musician Lonnie Gordon.  It was released in 1993 on SBK/EMI Records. The album is her most commercially successful to date. It was produced primarily by the group Black Box. The album includes the hit singles "Gonna Catch You" (originally released in 1991), "Happening All Over Again" (a 1993 remix of her 1990 hit), "Bad Mood" and "Do You Want It?". It includes covers of Gloria Gaynor's hit "I Will Survive" and Donny Hathaway's "Little Ghetto Boy".

Three of its singles, "Gonna Catch You", "Bad Mood" and "Happenin' All Over Again '93", all peaked at #1 on the U.S. Dance charts.

Critical reception
AllMusic editor Michael Gallucci said, "Gordon's three big club hits -- "Bad Mood", "Gonna Catch You", "Happening All Over Again"—are on her debut album, which is sort of a patchwork piece, gathering songs from a four-year period. You won't notice, though, since most of her dance jams stick to the same groove. Besides the aforementioned trio, this is pretty much standard fare." Alan Jones from Music Week wrote, "Disco diva Lonnie Gordon uses her pipes to good effect, notably on the title track (one of several contributed by Black Box) and a remix of her finest PWL effort, "Happening Ail Over Again". But there's more to this album than sheer lung power; "Stay Together" and "Missing You" are classy ballads. A fine effort overall, the album's fate rather depends on singles success, something which the title track should deliver. The only problem could be if the import doublepack single that's been around for months has already satisfied demand."

Track listing
"Love Can Turn Around"
"Bad Mood"
"Sing a Song"
"Little Ghetto Boy"
"Missing You"
"Gonna Catch You"
"Happening All Over Again (’93 remix)"
"Do You Want It?
"Stay Together"
"Your Touch"
"I Will Survive"
"Don't Stop Lovin' Me, Baby"

References

1993 albums
Lonnie Gordon albums
SBK Records albums